The British Embassy in Guatemala City is responsible for looking after the United Kingdom's interests in the Republic of Guatemala. The official title is His Brittanic Majesty’s Ambassador to the Republic of Guatemala.

The British ambassador to the Republic of Honduras is also resident in Guatemala City: the British embassy in Tegucigalpa, Honduras, was closed in 2003 the ambassador to Guatemala is also accredited to Honduras.

Heads of mission

External links
 UK and Guatemala – gov.uk

References

Guatemala
 
United Kingdom